The economy of Brunei, a small and wealthy country, is a mixture of foreign and domestic entrepreneurship, government regulation and welfare measures, and village traditions. It is almost entirely supported by exports of crude oil and natural gas, with revenues from the petroleum sector accounting for over half of GDP. Per capita GDP is high, and substantial income from overseas investment supplements income from domestic production. The government provides for all medical services and subsidizes food and housing. The government has shown progress in its basic policy of diversifying the economy away from oil and gas. Brunei's leaders are concerned that steadily increased integration in the world economy will undermine internal social cohesion although it has taken steps to become a more prominent player by serving as chairman for the 2000 APEC (Asia-Pacific Economic Cooperation) forum. Growth in 1999 was estimated at 2.5% due to higher oil prices in the second half.

It also is the ninth-largest producer of liquefied natural gas in the world.

Macro-economic trend

In the 1970s, Brunei invested sharply increasing revenues from petroleum exports and maintained government spending at a low and constant rate. Consequently, the government was able to build its foreign reserves and invest them around the world to help provide for future generations. Part of the reserve earnings were reportedly also used to help finance the government's annual budget deficit. Since 1986, however, petroleum revenues have decreased, and government spending has increased. The government has been running a budget deficit since 1988. The disappearance of a revenue surplus has made Brunei's economy more vulnerable to petroleum price fluctuations.

Brunei's gross domestic product (GDP) soared with the petroleum price increases of the 1970s to a peak of $5.7 billion in 1980. It declined slightly in each of the next 5 years, then fell by almost 30% in 1986.

This drop was caused by a combination of sharply lower petroleum prices in world markets and voluntary production cuts in Brunei. The GDP recovered somewhat since 1986, growing by 12% in 1987, 1% in 1988, and 9% in 1989. In recent years, GDP growth was 3.5% in 1996, 4.0% in 1997, 1.0% in 1998, and an estimated 2.5% in 1999. However, the 1999 GDP was still only about $4.5 billion, well below the 1980 peak.

The Asian financial crisis in 1997 and 1998, coupled with fluctuations in the price of oil have created uncertainty and instability in Brunei's economy. In addition, the 1998 collapse of Amedeo Development Corporation, Brunei's largest construction firm whose projects helped fuel the domestic economy, caused the country to slip into a mild recession.

This is a chart of trend of gross domestic product of Brunei Darussalam at market prices estimated by the International Monetary Fund with figures in millions of Bruneian dollars.

For purchasing power parity comparisons, the US dollar is exchanged at 1.52 Bruneian dollars only. Mean wages were $25.38 per man-hour in 2009.

The government regulates the immigration of foreign labor out of concern it might disrupt Brunei's society. Work permits for foreigners are issued only for short periods and must be continually renewed. Despite these restrictions, foreigners make up a significant portion of the work force. The government reported a total work force of 122,800 in 1999, with an unemployment rate of 5.5%.

Oil and natural gas account for almost all exports. Since only a few products other than petroleum are produced locally, a wide variety of items must be imported. Brunei statistics show Singapore as the largest point of origin of imports, accounting for 25% in 1997. However, this figure includes some transshipments, since most of Brunei's imports transit Singapore. Japan and Malaysia were the second-largest suppliers. As in many other countries, Japanese products dominate local markets for motor vehicles, construction equipment, electronic goods, and household appliances. The United States was the third-largest supplier of imports to Brunei in 1998.

Brunei's substantial foreign reserves are managed by the Brunei Investment Agency (BIA), an arm of the Ministry of Finance and Economy. BIA's guiding principle is to increase the real value of Brunei's foreign reserves while pursuing a diverse investment strategy, with holdings in the United States, Japan, western Europe, and the Association of South East Asian Nations (ASEAN) countries.

The Brunei Government actively encourages more foreign investment. New enterprises that meet certain criteria can receive pioneer status, exempting profits from income tax for up to 5 years, depending on the amount of capital invested. The normal corporate income tax rate is 30%. There is no personal income tax or capital gains tax.

One of the government's most important priorities is to encourage the development of Brunei Malays as leaders of industry and commerce. There are no specific restrictions of foreign equity ownership, but local participation, both shared capital and management, is encouraged. Such participation helps when tendering for contracts with the government or Brunei Shell Petroleum.

Companies in Brunei must either be incorporated locally or registered as a branch of a foreign company and must be registered with the Registrar of Companies. Public companies must have a minimum of seven shareholders. Private companies must have a minimum of two but not more than 50 shareholders. At least half of the directors in a company must be residents of Brunei.

Between 1981 and 2013 the Sultan owned cattle stations in Australia that supplied most of the country's beef. Some of the stations were sold in 2006 and 2014. As of 2019, the Sultan still owned the Opium Creek station.
Eggs and chickens are largely produced locally, but most of Brunei's other food needs must be imported. Agriculture and fisheries are among the industrial sectors that the government has selected for highest priority in its efforts to diversify the economy.

The following table shows the main economic indicators in 1983–2021 (with IMF staff estimates in 2022–2027). Inflation below 5% is in green.

Oil and gas industry
Brunei Shell Petroleum (BSP), a joint venture owned in equal shares by the Brunei Government and the Royal Dutch/Shell group of companies, is the chief oil and gas production company in Brunei. It also operates the country's only refinery. BSP and four sister companies constitute the largest employer in Brunei after the government. This satisfies domestic demand for most petroleum products.

The French oil company Elf Aquitaine became active in petroleum exploration in Brunei in the 1980s. Its affiliate Elf Petroleum Asia BV has discovered commercially exploitable quantities of oil and gas in three of the four wells drilled since 1987, including a particularly promising discovery announced in early 1990. Recently, UNOCAL, partnered with New Zealand's Fletcher Challenge has been granted concessions for oil exploration. Brunei is preparing to tender concessions for deep water oil and gas exploration.

Since then it has been deliberately cut back to extend the life of oil reserves and improve recovery rates. Japan has traditionally been the main customer for Brunei's oil exports, but its share dropped from 45% of the total in 1982 to 19% in 1998. In contrast, oil exports to South Korea increased from only 8% of the total in 1982 to 29% in 1998. Other major customers include Taiwan (6%), and the countries of ASEAN (27%). Brunei's oil exports to the United States accounted for 17% of the total exported.

Almost all of Brunei's natural gas is liquefied at Brunei Liquefied Natural Gas (LNG) plant, which opened in 1972 and is one of the largest LNG plants in the world. Over 82% of Brunei's LNG produced is sold to Japan under a long-term agreement renewed in 1993. The agreement calls for Brunei to provide over 5 million tons of LNG per year to three Japanese utilities. The Japanese company, Mitsubishi, is a joint venture partner with Shell and the Brunei Government in Brunei LNG, Brunei Coldgas, and Brunei Shell Tankers, which together produce the LNG and supply it to Japan. Since 1995, Brunei has supplied more than 700,000 tons of LNG to the Korea Gas Corporation as well. In 1999, Brunei's natural gas production reached 90 cargoes per day. A small amount of natural gas is used for domestic power generation. Brunei is the fourth-largest exporter of LNG in the Asia-Pacific region behind Indonesia, Malaysia, and Australia.

Brunei's proven oil and gas reserves are sufficient, as of 2015, to last until at least 2035. Deep sea exploration may find significant new reserves but can be prohibitively expensive. The government sought in the past decade to diversify the economy with limited success. Oil and gas and government spending still account for most of Brunei's economic activity. Brunei's non-petroleum industries include agriculture, forestry, fishing, and banking.

In 2015, Brunei registered its third year of economic recession, the only ASEAN nation to do so. Declining oil prices and a drop in production due to maintenance and repair work at major oil wells have dented the country's budget which will see a deficit in the fiscal years 2015-16 and 2016–17.

In 2020, more than 99% of produced electricity in Brunei was based on fossil fuels, while electricity produced from renewable energy accounted for less than 1%. It is advised for Brunei to diversify the economy away from the use of fossil fuels and focus more on renewable energy as part of climate change mitigation measures.

Petrochemical industry

In the western part of the country, Liang is currently experiencing a major development with the establishment of SPARK, which is a  site developed to be a world-class petrochemical hub. The first major investment at SPARK is the US$450 million Methanol plant developed by the Brunei Methanol Company, a joint venture between Petroleum Brunei and two leading Japanese companies, Mitsubishi Chemical Holdings and Itochu. The plant design will give an output of 2,500t of methanol per day (850,000t annually). The plant was officially launched by Sultan of Brunei Hassanal Bolkiah on 25 May 2010.

Halal brand
Brunei Darussalam in July 2009 launched its national halal branding scheme Brunei Halal which allows manufacturers in Brunei and in other countries to use the premium Brunei Halal trademark to help them penetrate lucrative markets in countries with significant numbers of Muslim consumers. The Brunei Halal brand is said to be the first proper attempt to put together a global halal brand that will reap the potential commercial returns of catering to the consumption needs of Muslims worldwide.

As envisioned by the Sultanate, the use of the Brunei Halal brand would signify to Muslim consumers the manufacturers' strict compliance with laws relating to Islamic teachings. Brunei also aims to build confidence in the brand through strategies that will both ensure the halal integrity of the products and unfaltering compliance with set rules governing the sourcing of raw materials, manufacturing process, logistics and distribution.

A new company, government-owned Brunei Wafirah Holdings Sdn Bhd, has been established as the owner of the Brunei Halal brand. Wafirah has entered into a joint venture with Brunei Global Islamic Investment and Hong Kong-based logistics firm Kerry FSDA Limited to form Ghanim International Food Corporation Sdn Bhd. Ghanim International manages the use of the Brunei Halal trademark. Producers that want to use the brand are required to first acquire the Brunei halal label (or the certification for compliance with accepted manufacturing and slaughtering practices under Islam) through the Department of Syariah Affairs' Halal Food Control Section. They can then approach Ghanim for their application to use the brand.

References

 
Brunei